Nikotimasi Fatafehi Laufilitonga Kakau Vahaʻi (born September 1971), styled Lord Vaha'i,  is a Tongan noble and politician. He holds the title of Vahaʻi of Foʻui.

Vaha'i was born in 1971 to Hahano-ki-Malaʻe Kula-ʻa Sione Ngu Namoa, Lord Vahaʻi, and his wife, ʻElisiva Fusipala Vahaʻi.

At the 2017 Tongan general election he was elected to the Legislative Assembly of Tonga in the Tongatapu Noble's constituency on a coin-toss, defeating ʻAlipate Tuʻivanuavou Vaea. He lost his seat at the 2021 election.

Honours
National honours
  Order of the Crown of Tonga, Commander (31 July 2008).

References

1971 births
Members of the Legislative Assembly of Tonga
Living people
People from Tongatapu
Tongan nobles
Commanders of the Order of the Crown of Tonga